Elachisoma is a genus of flies belonging to the family Lesser Dung flies.

Species
E. afrotropicum Papp, 1983
E. approximatum (Malloch, 1913)
E. aterrimum (Haliday, 1833)
E. bajzae Papp, 1983
E. braacki Papp, 1983
E. euphorbiae Papp, 1977
E. kerteszi (Duda, 1924)
E. pilosum (Duda, 1924)

References

Sphaeroceridae
Diptera of North America
Diptera of Africa
Diptera of Europe
Brachycera genera
Taxa named by Camillo Rondani